Oskar Jarle Grimstad (born 8 November 1954) is a Norwegian politician representing the Progress Party (FrP) for Møre og Romsdal. He is a member of the Standing Committee on Energy and the Environment.

Grimstad was a member of the Progress Party's central board between 1999 and 2008. Grimstad was deputy mayor of Hareid between 1999 and 2003, and then a member of the Møre og Romsdal county council between 2003 and 2009. He was successfully nominated for the Storting in second place on FrP's Møre og Romsdal ballot ahead of the 2009 parliamentary election.

Aside from politics, Grimstad has been a seaman, and a welder. Since 1976 he has been the director of three metalworking firms. Grimstad is married and has two adult daughters. Grimstad's youngest daughter Kamilla (17) died in a disastrous fire shortly before Christmas 2008.

References

1954 births
Living people
Progress Party (Norway) politicians
Members of the Storting
People from Hareid
Møre og Romsdal politicians
21st-century Norwegian politicians